Lathronympha strigana is a species of moth in the family Tortricidae.

Description
Lathronympha strigana is a medium-sized moth with a wingspan of 14–18 mm. The basic color of the wings is light reddish brown. The forewings have a few light lines at the wing tip and two silver cross bars in the outer rear section. Adults are on wing from June to July, sometimes with a second generation in late August or September. The larvae are a little flat, gray green with darker spots and a maroon head. They feed on Hypericum species (St. John's worts).

Distribution
This species can be found in most of Europe, except in the far north, and in northern Asia.

Habitat
Lathronympha strigana prefers open forests, roadsides and other places where the host plant grows.

References

Fauna Europaea
Aarvik, L., Berggren, K. og Hansen, L.O. (2000) Catalogus Lepidopterorum Norvegiae. Norwegian Entomological Society / Norwegian Institute for Forest Research, 192 pages

Olethreutinae
Moths of Europe
Insects of Turkey
Taxa named by Johan Christian Fabricius